Morning Comes Again is the first studio album by the Dutch band The Fudge. It was released in 2011.

Track listing
"Too Busy Being Delicious'" – 2:57
"Morning Comes Again" – 4:09
"The Only One" – 2:41
"The Last Parade" - 3:24
"Behind the Wall" – 3:34
"Wasting All Your Time" 1:15
"Sweet Little Princess" – 3:34
"Insane" - 2:56
"2nd of March" – 2:30
"Go Away" – 3:51

References

2011 debut albums
The Fudge albums